Valsø Holm (31 December 1906 – 19 December 1987) was a Danish film actor. He appeared in 80 films between 1937 and 1982. He was born in Copenhagen, Denmark and died in Denmark.

Filmography

En søndag på Amager - 1941
To som elsker hinanden - 1944
Det bødes der for - 1944
Mordets melodi - 1944
Ditte Menneskebarn - 1946
De pokkers unger - 1947
Kristinus Bergman - 1948
Penge som græs - 1948
For frihed og ret - 1949
Din fortid er glemt - 1950
Vesterhavsdrenge - 1950
Den gamle mølle på Mols - 1953
Kongeligt besøg - 1954
Karen, Maren og Mette - 1954
Altid ballade - 1955
Kristiane af Marstal - 1956
Seksdagesløbet - 1958
Guld og grønne skove - 1958
Spion 503 - 1958
Helle for Helene - 1959
Poeten og Lillemor - 1959
Forelsket i København - 1960
Tro, håb og trolddom - 1960
Harry og kammertjeneren - 1961
Landsbylægen - 1961
Det tossede paradis - 1962
Frøken April - 1963
Bussen - 1963
Støv for alle pengene - 1963
Vi har det jo dejligt - 1963
Don Olsen kommer til byen - 1964
Een pige og 39 sømænd - 1965
 - 1965
Hold da helt ferie - 1965
Mor bag rattet - 1965
Næsbygaards arving - 1965
Slå først, Frede - 1965
Sytten - 1965
En ven i bolignøden - 1965
Flagermusen - 1966
Soyas tagsten - 1966
Min kones ferie - 1967
Far laver sovsen - 1967
Mig og min lillebror - 1967
Olsen-banden (film) - 1968
Det er så synd for farmand - 1968
Rend mig i revolutionen - 1970
Tandlæge på sengekanten - 1970
Den forsvundne fuldmægtig - 1971
Motorvej på sengekanten - 1972
Romantik på sengekanten - 1973
Fætrene på Torndal - 1973
På'en igen Amalie - 1973
Olsen-bandens sidste bedrifter - 1974
Der må være en sengekant - 1975
Affæren i Mølleby - 1976
Hopla på sengekanten - 1976
Pas på ryggen, professor - 1977
Fængslende feriedage - 1978
Agent 69 Jensen i Skyttens tegn - 1978
Undskyld vi er her - 1980
Det parallelle lig - 1982

External links

1906 births
1987 deaths
Danish male film actors
Male actors from Copenhagen
20th-century Danish male actors